William Greenough Thayer Shedd (June 21, 1820November 17, 1894), son of the Reverend Marshall Shedd and Eliza Thayer, was an American Presbyterian theologian born in Acton, Massachusetts.

In 1835, Shedd enrolled at the University of Vermont, and became a protégé of UVM president James Marsh. Under the influence of his mentor, Shedd was deeply affected by the thought of Samuel Taylor Coleridge and Transcendentalism. He graduated from UVM in 1839 and taught school for one year, during which time he began to attend the Presbyterian church. Being called to the ministry, Shedd entered Andover Theological Seminary in 1840 and studied under theologian Leonard Woods. He graduated in 1843.

After a short pastorate at Brandon, Vermont, he was successively professor of English literature at the University of Vermont (1845–1852), professor of sacred rhetoric in Auburn Theological Seminary (1852–1854), professor of church history in Andover Theological Seminary (1854–1862), and, after one year (1862–1863) as associate pastor of the Brick Church of New York City, of sacred literature (1863–1874) and of systematic theology (1874–1890) in Union Theological Seminary. He died in New York City on November 17, 1894.

Dr. Shedd was a high Calvinist and was one of the most notable systematic theologians of the American Presbyterian church. His great work was Dogmatic Theology (3 vols, 1888–1894). He served as editor of Coleridge's Complete Works (7 vols, New York, 1894). He also wrote:

The Influence of Temperance Upon Intellectual Discipline: A Discourse Delivered Before the Temperance Society of the University of Vermont (1844)
Lectures on the Philosophy of History (1856), in which he applied to history the doctrine of organic evolution
Discourses and Essays (1856)
A Manual of Church History (2 vols, 1857), a translation of Guericke
A History of Christian Doctrine (2 vols, 1863)
Homiletics and Pastoral Theology (1867)
Sermons to the Natural Man (1871)
Theological Essays (1877)
Literary Essays (1878)
Commentary on the Epistle to the Romans (1879)
 Sermons to the Spiritual Man (1884)
The Doctrine of Endless Punishment (1885)

References

External links

 
 
 

1820 births
1894 deaths
American Calvinist and Reformed theologians
19th-century Calvinist and Reformed theologians
University of Vermont alumni
Andover Newton Theological School alumni
Andover Newton Theological School faculty
University of Vermont faculty
Union Theological Seminary (New York City) faculty
Auburn Theological Seminary faculty